Khorramabad (also Romanized as Khorramābād) is a village in Chubar Rural District, Ahmadsargurab District, Shaft County, Gilan Province, Iran. At the 2006 census, its population was 130, in 40 families.

References 

Populated places in Shaft County